Armijo is a surname. Notable people with the surname include:

Alberto Armijo (1926–2021), Costa Rican football player
Antonio Armijo (1804–1850), Mexican explorer and merchant
Christina Armijo (born 1951), American judge
Dolores Elizabeth “Lola” Chávez de Armijo (1858–1929), American librarian
José Gabriel de Armijo (1774–1830), Spanish-Mexican military commander 
Manuel Armijo (ca. 1793–1853), American soldier and statesman
Perfecto Armijo (1845–1913), American frontier trader, store owner, probate judge, county sheriff, alderman, county treasurer and rancher
 Dave Armijo (1987) American businessman